Yunnanilus nigromaculatus is a species of stone loach endemic to the Dianchi Lake basin (which includes the small Yangling Lake) in China, but has apparently been extirpated from Dianchi Lake itself due to heavy pollution. It was formerly placed in the genus Eonemachilus.

References

nigromaculatus
Endemic fauna of Yunnan
Freshwater fish of China
Taxa named by Charles Tate Regan
Fish described in 1904
Taxonomy articles created by Polbot